Delaware County is a county located in the central portion of the U.S. state of Ohio. It is a frequent placeholder on the List of highest-income counties in the United States. As of the 2020 census, the population was 214,124. Its county seat and largest city is Delaware. The county was formed in 1808 from Franklin County, Ohio. Both the county and its seat are named after the Delaware Indian tribe. Delaware County was listed as the 35th wealthiest county in the United States in 2020. Delaware County is included in the Columbus, Ohio, metropolitan area. U.S. President Rutherford B. Hayes was born and raised in Delaware County. It is also home to the Columbus Zoo and Aquarium.

History
The area including Delaware County was once home to numerous Native American tribes. In 1804, Colonel Moses Byxbe and Henry Baldwin, among others, migrated to central Ohio from Berkshire County, Massachusetts, and built a town on the west bank of the Olentangy River. On February 10, 1808, the Ohio government authorized the creation of Delaware County. Following the War of 1812, settlers began to arrive in the county and settled down in Delaware. The town was incorporated in 1816, being the first incorporated town in the county. Powell, originally named Middlebury, was founded in 1801, but was not incorporated until 1947. Sunbury was founded in 1816. Ohio Wesleyan University, a liberal arts college, was founded by Methodists in 1842.

Delaware County had Northern sympathies during the Civil War, and abolitionists brought the Underground Railroad through the area. A local road, Africa Road, derives its name from the era. Camp Delaware was one of the few Civil War camps that deployed African American soldiers. The Civil War played an important part in Delaware County's growth, bringing railroad business and technology. By 1900, Delaware had its first electric streetway, and an electric interurban railroad connecting Marion and Columbus ran through the county. The Little Brown Jug race was founded in 1946, and is one of the races in the Triple Crown of Harness Racing for Pacers.

In 2008, Forbes magazine ranked Delaware County as the fifth best place in the United States to raise a family and the second best in Ohio, behind Geauga County. in 2020 Delaware was rated the best county to live in Ohio and 24th in the United States by Niche, 17th healthiest county by US News, and 24th best counties to live in by 247WallSt.

Geography
The county has an even terrain and a fertile soil.

Adjacent counties
Morrow County (north)
Knox County (northeast)
Licking County (east)
Franklin County (south)
Union County (west)
Marion County (northwest)

Lakes and rivers
The major rivers of the county are the Scioto River, Olentangy River,  Alum Creek, and the Big Walnut Creek. These waterways run from north to south across the county. The Alum Creek Lake and the Delaware Lake are reservoirs created on Alum Creek and the Olentangy River, respectively.

Demographics

2000 census
As of the census of 2000, there were 109,989 people, 39,674 households, and 30,668 families living in the county. The population density is 249 people per square mile (96/km2). There were 42,374 housing units at an average density of 96 per square mile (37/km2). The racial makeup of the county was 94.25% White, 2.52% Black or African American, 0.14% Native American, 1.54% Asian, 0.03% Pacific Islander, 0.38% from other races, and 1.14% from two or more races. Hispanic or Latino of any race were 1.01% of the population. 26.8% were of German, 11.7% Irish, 11.3% English, 10.7% American and 6.9% Italian ancestry according to 2000 census.

There were 39,674 households, out of which 40.10% had children under the age of 18 living with them, 67.70% were married couples living together, 6.70% had a female householder with no husband present, and 22.70% were non-families. 18.10% of all households were made up of individuals, and 5.30% had someone living alone who was 65 years of age or older. The average household size was 2.70 and the average family size was 3.09.

In the county, the population was spread out, with 28.20% under the age of 18, 7.60% from 18 to 24, 32.60% from 25 to 44, 23.30% from 45 to 64, and 8.20% who were 65 years of age or older. The median age was 35 years. For every 100 females there were 98.00 males. For every 100 females age 18 and over, there were 94.90 males.

The median income for a household in the county was $67,258, and the median income for a family was $76,453. Males had a median income of $51,428 versus $33,041 for females. The per capita income for the county was $31,600. About 2.90% of families and 3.80% of the population were below the poverty line, including 4.40% of those under the age of 18 and 4.80% of those 65 and older.

By 2007, the median income for a household and for a family had risen to $80,526 and $94,099 respectively.

According to the United States Census Bureau, Delaware County is the 21st fastest growing county in the United States.

2010 census
As of the 2010 United States census, there were 174,214 people, 62,760 households, and 47,977 families living in the county. The racial makeup of the county was 89.7% white, 4.3% Asian, 3.4% black or African American, 0.1% American Indian, 0.6% from other races, and 1.8% from two or more races. Those of Hispanic or Latino origin made up 2.1% of the population. In terms of ancestry, 34.2% were German, 16.3% were Irish, 14.0% were English, 8.1% were Italian, and 5.7% were American.

Of the 62,760 households, 41.9% had children under the age of 18 living with them, 65.8% were married couples living together, 7.3% had a female householder with no husband present, 23.6% were non-families, and 19.0% of all households were made up of individuals. The average household size was 2.74 and the average family size was 3.16. The median age was 37.4 years.

The median income for a household in the county was $87,908 and the median income for a family was $101,698. Males had a median income of $70,949 versus $48,913 for females. The per capita income for the county was $40,682. About 3.4% of families and 4.6% of the population were below the poverty line, including 4.8% of those under age 18 and 5.4% of those age 65 or over.

Politics
Delaware County is considered a Republican stronghold, and has been so for most of the party's history. The only Democratic president candidate to win the county from 1856 to the present day was Woodrow Wilson in his 1912 & 1916 electoral victories. However, in 2020 Joe Biden came within single digits of flipping the county, the closest result since Lyndon Johnson’s landslide victory in 1964.

|}

Education
The following school districts are located in Delaware County.

 Big Walnut Local SD 
 Buckeye Valley Local SD
 Centerburg Local SD1 
 Delaware City SD
 Dublin City SD²
 Elgin Local SD³ 
 Johnstown-Monroe Local SD5 
 Northridge Local SD5
 North Union Local SD6
 Olentangy Local SD
 Westerville City SD7

Other facilities:
Delaware Area Career Center

1 Mainly in Knox County, with portions in Delaware County
2 Mainly in Franklin County, with portions in Delaware County and Union County
3 Mainly in Marion County, with portions in Delaware County
4 Mainly in Morrow County, with portions in Delaware County
5 Mainly in Licking County, with portions in Delaware County
6 Mainly in Union County, with portions in Delaware County
7 Mainly in Franklin County, with portions in Delaware County

The Ohio Wesleyan University, located in Delaware, Ohio, is one of the top liberal arts colleges in the United States and one of the Five Colleges of Ohio.

Transportation

Major highways

Airports
The area is served by the Delaware Municipal Airport, which serves the rapidly developing southern Delaware County area and the north portion of the Franklin County and Columbus areas.  The airport contains a 5,000 foot runway, flight terminal, lounges, and weather briefing areas. It is home to approximately 80 aircraft and an estimated 40,000 operations take place per year. Several smaller airports  are located in the county.

Media

The Delaware Gazette, a morning daily founded in 1885, is the dominant local newspaper in Delaware County, while the Sunbury News, a weekly community newspaper, serves eastern Delaware County and residents of the Big Walnut Local School District. Both publications are owned by Brown Publishing Company.

Additional local print publications include ThisWeek Delaware News, which covers the city of Delaware and the villages of Galena and Sunbury; and ThisWeek Olentangy Valley News, which covers Powell and the Olentangy Local School District. Both weekly papers are among 21 published by ThisWeek Community News, headquartered in southern Delaware County. ThisWeek is owned by GateHouse Media, which also owns the Columbus Dispatch. The Village of Shawnee Hills in southwestern Delaware County is served by a monthly newspaper - The Village Gazette.  The Village Gazette is independent.

Other local publications include the Transcript, the student paper at Ohio Wesleyan University.

Points of interest
Delaware, Ohio is famous for The Little Brown Jug, an internationally famous harness race which is part of the Triple Crown of harness racing.

The Methodist Theological School in Ohio is the Methodist graduate school seminary located between Delaware and Columbus, Ohio.  It is often referred to as METHESCO.

Additional notable places include:

Delaware Municipal Airport Annual Air Fair
Columbus Zoo and Aquarium
Zoombezi Bay Waterpark (formerly Wyandot Lake Adventure Park)
Safari Golf club
The Germain Amphitheater, formerly the Polaris Amphitheater, closed at the end of 2007
Alum Creek State Park and the Delaware State Park bring millions of local, national, and international visitors to the area each year. 
The site of the first Ohio State University football game
The Hamburger Inn at 16 N. Sandusky 
Historical Marker of Rutherford B. Hayes' home on E. William St.
The Strand Theater.
Polaris centers of commerce (Big commercial business area including Americas 2nd largest low rise office building - JPMorgan Chase McCoy Center - and the high end Polaris fashion place mall)
Perkins Observatory
The Ross Art Museum

Communities

Cities
Columbus (state capital) (mostly in Franklin County and partly in Fairfield County)
Delaware (county seat)
Dublin (partly in Franklin County and Union County)
Powell
Sunbury
Westerville (mostly in Franklin County)

Villages
Ashley
Galena
Ostrander
Shawnee Hills

Census-designated places
Kilbourne
Radnor

Townships

Berkshire
Berlin
Brown
Concord
Delaware
Genoa
Harlem
Kingston
Liberty
Marlboro
Orange
Oxford
Porter
Radnor
Scioto
Thompson
Trenton
Troy

https://web.archive.org/web/20160715023447/http://www.ohiotownships.org/township-websites

Unincorporated communities

 Africa 
 Alum Creek
 Bellepoint
 Berkshire
 Carpenter's Mill
 Center Village
 Cheshire
 Coles Mills
 Condit
 Cones Mills
 East Liberty
 Edinburgh
 Harlem
 Hyatts
 Kingston Center
 Leonardsburg
 Lewis Center 
 Norton
 Olive Green
 Orange
 Rome
 Stratford
 Vans Valley
 White Sulphur

Notable residents
Notable people who have lived in or been associated with the county include:

Horace Newton Allen, diplomat
Ben Curtis, professional golfer
Amos Dolbear, physicist and inventor
Lou Ferrigno, actor and bodybuilder, two-time Mr. Universe winner
Arthur Sherwood Flemming, statesman
Jack Hanna, zookeeper, media personality, Director Emeritus of the Columbus Zoo and Aquarium
Lucy Webb Hayes, 19th First Lady of the United States
Rutherford B. Hayes, 19th President of the United States
Reuben James, U. S. Naval hero
Clare Kramer, actress
Vincente Minnelli, Academy Award winning film director, second husband of Judy Garland, father of Liza Minnelli
Norman Vincent Peale, author
John Purdue, founding benefactor of Purdue University
Branch Rickey, MLB executive
Buck Rodgers, professional baseball player
William Rosecrans, U. S. Army Major General 
Frank Sherwood Rowland, Nobel laureate
Ezra Vogel, professor emeritus, Harvard University

See also
National Register of Historic Places listings in Delaware County, Ohio

References

Further reading
Buckingham, Ray, E. Delaware County Then and Now, History Book, Inc., 1976
History of Delaware County and Ohio. Chicago: O. L. Baskin & Co., 1880
Lytle, A. R., History of Delaware County Ohio, Delaware, 1908
Memorial Record of the Counties of Delaware, union and Morrow, Ohio, Chicago, The Lewis Publishing Company, 1895

External links
 Delaware County Government official site
 Delaware County Memory - Digital archive of historical documents and artifacts from Delaware County

 
1808 establishments in Ohio